NBA Today is an American television sports talk program on ESPN (or on rare occasions ESPN2), hosted by Malika Andrews, featuring Kendrick Perkins, Chiney Ogwumike, Vince Carter, Richard Jefferson and Zach Lowe as panelists. The show premiered on October 18, 2021, on ESPN2. NBA Today airs live on weekdays at 3 p.m. ET/12 p.m. PT.

NBA Today includes latest news, opinion and analysis on the National Basketball Association (NBA). The show is based in Los Angeles. In the future, NBA Today will travel to marquee NBA events, including the NBA Finals for on-site shows. NBA Today replaced The Jump as ESPN's daily NBA studio show.

References

2020s American television talk shows
2021 American television series debuts
American sports television series
English-language television shows
ESPN original programming
National Basketball Association on television